Government Degree College is the co-ed college in Kathua, Jammu and Kashmir, India and serves to the people of Kathua district and its adjoining areas. It was established in 1961 which makes it one of the oldest college of Jammu and Kashmir.It is about 3 km from the heart of the Kathua city.It is a NAAC accredited 'B' grade college. It runs courses in Sciences, Arts, Firshries, Computer Sciences (BCA) for three years degree courses. The college is affiliated to University of Jammu. During any given year 3000+ students study for the various courses. The selection to the courses is based on the +2 marks. Hostel facilities are also provided for boys and girls.

Departments 
The college is divided into Arts Block, Science (Non Medical) block and Science(Medical) block and Commerce block besides separate blocks for Home science and post graduation in Geography. There are various departments in the campus. Computer sciences was introduced in 2001/2002 and now runs successfully BCA courses.

Library 
The college also has its own library that boasts of large number of books, magazines and newspapers for the students.

Students 
During any year more than 3000 students study in the college for various courses.

Miscellaneous 
College repeatedly secures top positions amongst all the Jammu region colleges during the final year results. Best part of college is that there is no student politics here and one can focus on studies without any problem. faculty is good and cooperative.

External links
 History of Kathua
 Official Website of District Kathua (J&K)
 Official Website of Govt. Degree College Kathua (J&K)

Universities and colleges in Jammu and Kashmir